The 2016 Europe Tennis Center Ladies Open was a professional tennis tournament played on outdoor clay courts. It was the 20th edition of the tournament and part of the 2016 ITF Women's Circuit, offering a total of $100,000 in prize money. It took place in Budapest, Hungary, from 4 to 10 July 2016.

Singles main draw entrants

Seeds 

 1 Rankings as of 27 June 2016.

Other entrants 
The following player received a wildcard into the singles main draw:
  Ágnes Bukta
  Viktorija Golubic
  Tereza Mihalíková
  Fanny Stollár

The following players received entry from the qualifying draw:
  Ema Burgić Bucko
  Martina Di Giuseppe
  Anastasiya Vasylyeva
  Ekaterina Yashina

The following player received entry by a lucky loser spot:
  Sofia Kvatsabaia

Champions

Singles

 Elitsa Kostova def.  Viktoriya Tomova, 6–0, 7–6(7–3)

Doubles

 Ema Burgić Bucko /  Georgina García Pérez def.  Lenka Kunčíková /  Karolína Stuchlá, 6–4, 2–6, [12–10]

External links 
 2016 Europe Tennis Center Ladies Open at ITFtennis.com
 Official website 

2016 ITF Women's Circuit
2016 in Hungarian women's sport
Budapest Grand Prix
Buda